Chocolate is a 2019 Malayalam-language soap opera directed by Biju Varghese, starring Sandra Babu, Bipin Jose, Rahul Ravi and Shreya Surendran. It premiered on  Surya TV from 20 May 2019 and the show abruptly ended due to the global COVID-19 pandemic. The show is produced by Vision Time India Pvt Ltd. It is the officially remade into Sun TV as Chocolate.

Synopsis
Chocolate is the story of Vikram and Shyamili. Vikram is a wealthy businessman, and Shyamili is an ordinary girl with an extraordinary talent for baking mouthwatering dark chocolate cookies. Circumstances force her to quit baking until she cross-paths with Vikram.

Cast
 Main
Sandra Babu as Shyamili Vikram
Rahul Ravi / Bipin Jose as Vikram
Sriya Surendran as Soundarya
Rahul Ravi as Roshan
 Recurring
Ravikumar as Parameswaran Mangalath, Vikram's grandfather
Niharika/Thara Kalyan / Sharika Menon as Kousalya, Vikram's mother
Lishoy as Sethumadhavan, Vikram's father
KPAC Saji as Lakshmanan, Vikram's uncle
Nila Raj as Chithra, Lakshmanan's wife
Kottayam Pradeep as Balan, Shyamili's father
Gayathri Priya as Lakshmi, Shyamili's mother
Shalini as Shalini, Shyamili's sister
Sriraj Amrithraj as Raghu
Kalyan Khanna as Shanthanu
Avinash Ashok as Anirudh
Akshitha Ashok as Vyshnavi
Vaigha Rose as Helen
Rahul Mohan as Menon
Reshmi Boban
Sreelakshmi Sreekumar

Adaptations

References

Malayalam-language television shows
Surya TV original programming
2019 Indian television series debuts